The Fokker K.I (for Kampfflugzeug/"combat aircraft"), also known as the M.9, was a German experimental aircraft.

First flown in 1915, the M.9 had two M.7 fuselages and tails, without engines, mounted on the lower wing. To this was added a central nacelle with two seven-cylinder 80 hp Oberursel U.0  rotary engines, one at either end, in a centerline thrust configuration. The crew of three included a pilot in the nacelle, and one gunner positioned at the nose of each fuselage.

Mounting the two fuselages on the wings with no connection between them further aft turned out to be a mistake. Fokker was still using wing warping instead of ailerons for roll control, so when the wings were warped, the fuselages were deflected in opposite directions, either up or down depending upon which way the aircraft was rolled. This led to some very divergent flight characteristics. The test program was brief.

1910s German attack aircraft
K.I
Aircraft first flown in 1915
Rotary-engined aircraft
Twin-fuselage aircraft